Heinrich Dernburg (3 March 1829 – 23 November 1907) was a German jurist, professor, and politician.

Dernburg was born on 3 March 1829 in Mainz. Of Jewish origin, Dernburg was baptized as a Christian together with his family in 1841. He was educated at the gymnasium of Mainz and the universities of Gießen and Berlin, graduating from the latter in 1851. In the same year he became Privat-docent of the juridical faculty of the University of Heidelberg. In 1852 he was called to Zürich as assistant professor, and was appointed professor in 1855. In 1862 he accepted a similar position in the University of Halle, which he represented in the Prussian House of Lords from 1866 to 1873, when he became professor of Roman and Prussian law in the University of Berlin. He reentered the Herrenhaus in 1873. With Brinckmann and others he founded in 1851 the Kritische Zeitschrift für die Gesammte Rechtswissenschaft.

Dernburg was one of the leading experts for Prussian civil law as codified in the ALR. His work sought to keep a balance between "mercantile interests" and "social utopias". Unlike other Pandect scholars of his time, Dernburg was never accused of advocating a doctrinary and reactionary form of legal positivism.

He died on 23 November 1907 in Berlin-Charlottenburg.

Works 
Among his works may be mentioned:

  2d ed., 1868.
 
 
 
 
 
 
  3d ed., edited by Schultzenstein, 1886.
 "Das Preussische Hypothekenrecht" (with Hinrichs), Leipzig, 1877–91;
 "Pandekten," ib. 1884–87; 6th ed., 1900–01;
 "Die Königliche Friedrich-Wilhelms-Universität Berlin in Ihrem Personalbestande seit Ihrer Einrichtung bis 1885," ib. 1885;
 "Das Bürgerliche Recht des Deutschen Reiches und Preussen," Halle, 1898–1900.

Bibliography

References 

1829 births
1907 deaths
Jurists from Hesse
German people of Jewish descent
Politicians from Mainz
People from Rhenish Hesse
Members of the Prussian House of Lords
University of Giessen alumni
Humboldt University of Berlin alumni
Academic staff of the Humboldt University of Berlin
Academic staff of Heidelberg University
People associated with the University of Zurich
Academic staff of the Martin Luther University of Halle-Wittenberg
Converts to Christianity from Judaism